Ceramidia is a genus of moths in the subfamily Arctiinae. The genus was erected by Arthur Gardiner Butler in 1876.

Species
 Ceramidia fumipennis Walker, 1854
 Ceramidia phemonoides Möschler, 1854

References

External links

Euchromiina
Moth genera